The 1982 United States Senate election in Hawaii took place on November 2, 1982. Incumbent Democratic U.S. Senator Spark Matsunaga won re-election to a second term.

Major candidates

Democratic 
Spark Matsunaga, incumbent U.S. Senator

Republican 
Clarence Brown, retired Foreign Service officer

Results

See also 
 1982 United States Senate elections

References 

Hawaii
1982
1982 Hawaii elections